Macaria brunneata, the Rannoch looper, is a moth of the family Geometridae. The species was first described by Carl Peter Thunberg in 1784. It is found in Siberia, Japan, and northern and mountainous parts of North America, and throughout Europe, though in Britain it is largely or entirely restricted to mature forests in central Scotland.

It flies during the day, and when at rest often holds its wings closed as a butterfly does. The moth flies in June and July in Britain and in July and August in North America.

The caterpillars feed on bilberry in Britain and on that and other plants of the heath family, such as bearberry, in North America.

Notes

External links
Lepiforum e.V.
De Vlinderstichting 

Macariini
Moths described in 1784
Moths of Asia
Moths of Europe
Moths of North America
Taxa named by Carl Peter Thunberg